Rosso Antico ("Ancient red") is an aperitif produced in San Lazzaro di Savena, Italy. It is produced by the infusion of 32 herbs macerated in alcohol (including rosemary, thyme and sage) and then added to a mixture of 5 different types of wine. The drink is ruby-colored and has a sweet-sour flavor with notes of citrus and vanilla. Its alcohol content is 17% and is recommended for consumption as an aperitif, served plain with a slice of orange. It is sometimes used as an ingredient in a Negroni cocktail, as a substitute for Vermouth.

Rosso Antico is also a name for a fancy type of marble, much used by the Romans. It is also a red stoneware body developed by Josiah Wedgwood.

References

Cuisine of Emilia-Romagna
Dessert wine